Prata is a village in Tuscany, central Italy, administratively a frazione of the comune of Massa Marittima, province of Grosseto, in the area of the Colline Metallifere. At the time of the 2001 census its population amounted to 559.

Prata is about 48 km from Grosseto and 12 km from Massa Marittima, and it is a small medieval village (12th century) situated on a hill of Colline Metallifere.

Main sights 
 Santa Maria Assunta, main parish church of the village, it was originally built as a pieve in the 12th century.
 Ruins of Cassero, a 13th-century fortress.

References

Bibliography 
 Aldo Mazzolai, Guida della Maremma. Percorsi tra arte e natura, Le Lettere, Florence, 1997.

See also 
 Ghirlanda
 Montebamboli
 Niccioleta
 Tatti, Massa Marittima
 Valpiana

Frazioni of Massa Marittima